Bystřany (formerly Horušany) is a municipality and village in Teplice District in the Ústí nad Labem Region of the Czech Republic. It has about 1,900 inhabitants.

Administrative parts

Villages of Nechvalice, Nové Dvory, Světice and Úpořiny are administrative parts of Bystřany.

Geography
It lies in the Central Bohemian Uplands. The Bystřice Stream flows through the municipality.

History
The village of Horušany in the Bystřany area was first mentioned in 1238. The first written mention of Bystřany is from 1508. Bystřany became an industrial village in the 19th century and remained that way into the 20th century.

Transport
The Lovosice–Teplice railway runs through Bystřany.

Sights
A cultural monument is the chapel in the old part of Bystřany from 1811. An architecturally significant building is the Protestant church from the end of the 19th century.

References

External links

Villages in Teplice District